Kamba, or Kikamba, is a Bantu language spoken by millions of Kamba people, primarily in Kenya, as well as thousands of people in Uganda, Tanzania, and elsewhere.  In Kenya, Kamba is generally spoken in four counties: Machakos, Kitui,  Makueni, and Kwale. The Machakos dialect is considered the standard variety and has been used in translation.  The other major dialect is Kitui.

Kamba has lexical similarities to other Bantu languages such as Kikuyu, Meru, and Embu.

The Swedish National Museums of World Culture holds field recordings of kamba language made by Swedish ethnographer Gerhard Lindblom in 1911–12. Lindblom used phonograph cylinders to record songs along with other means of documentation in writing and photography. He also gathered objects, and later presented his work in The Akamba in British East Africa (1916).

Phonology

Vowels

Consonants 

 /tʃ/ occurs as a result of palatalization among /k/ before /j/.
 In post-nasal positions, sounds /t, k, s, tʃ/ then become voiced as [d, ɡ, z, dʒ]. The voiced fricative /β/ then becomes a voiced stop [b] in post-nasal position.
 The palatal glide sound /j/ is typically articulated to the front of the mouth, so that is interdental as [ð̞] or alveolo-palatal as [j̟]. When preceding a consonant however, it is always heard as a regular palatal glide [j].

References

Sources
 Mwau, John Harun (2006). Kikamba Dictionary: Kikamba-English, Kikamba-Kikamba, English-Kikamba. .

External links
PanAfriL10n page on Kamba
Ĩvuku ya Mboya kwa andũ Onthe Portions of the Book of Common Prayer in Kamba, digitized by Richard Mammana

 
Northeast Bantu languages
Languages of Kenya